Luis Lázaro Agüero Jiménez (born 1991) is an international Chess Grandmaster titled in 2019.

References 

Chess grandmasters
1991 births
Living people